The Château de Drée is a historic château in Curbigny, Saône-et-Loire, Bourgogne-Franche-Comté, France. It was built in the 17th century. It has been listed as an official historical monument by the French Ministry of Culture since 1959.

References

Châteaux in Saône-et-Loire
Monuments historiques of Bourgogne-Franche-Comté